Pseudopolydesmus erasus is a species of flat-backed millipedes in the family Polydesmidae. It is found in North America.

References

Polydesmida